The Goofy Gophers is a 1947 Warner Bros. Looney Tunes cartoon directed by Bob Clampett and Arthur Davis. The short was released on January 25, 1947, and is the first appearance of the Goofy Gophers.

Plot
An anthropomorphic dog who is based on John Barrymore is guarding a vegetable garden and falling asleep. However, the dog then spots two gophers eating carrots. The dog disguises himself as a tomato vine and poses as an actual plant in the garden. The Gophers spot the tomato vine, grab a bunch of vegetables, and throw a pumpkin on the dog before striking him with a spade. The gags are plenty as the Gophers continue to outwit their dog nemesis. Eventually, they launch the dog, via rocket, into outer space towards the moon and now there are four crescent moons. The Gophers, now triumphant, gloat that they will have all the carrots all to themselves. But suddenly, they hear a familiar "Eh," and a familiar carrot chomping noise and there stands Bugs Bunny who says the popular catchphrase from The Great Gildersleeve, "Well, now, I wouldn't say that!" as the cartoon ends.

Notes
Among some of the music cues heard throughout the short are:
 "Merrily We Roll Along" - Merrie Melodies theme music; heard when one of the gophers makes like Bugs Bunny.
 "The Wish That I Wish Tonight" - played prominently throughout the cartoon; especially when the Gophers gather vegetables while pulling the dog by his nose. This musical number is previously heard in "Hare Remover"  and "Kitty Kornered" and would later be used again in "Water, Water Every Hare".
 "Mysterious Mose" - A Latin-flavored version of the musical number plays as the vegetables disappear one-by-one. Commonly, this musical number plays during horror scenes in cartoons, particularly the 1930 Betty Boop cartoon of the same name from Fleischer Studios. 
 "Minuet in G" - Played when the Gophers dance with the hand puppet.
 "Let’s Sing a Song About Susie"- Played when the Gophers suggest what vegetables they should take next; also played when they prepare to launch the dog to the moon via rocket launcher.
 "Rock-a-Bye Baby" - Played when the moon blows up into four crescents.
This is one of the few cartoons that Clampett had planned but didn't finish before he left the studio in 1946. Like this short, "Bacall to Arms" was finished by Arthur Davis, while "Birth of a Notion" was finished by Robert McKimson, and "Tweetie Pie" was finished by Friz Freleng. Voice recording however was the only finished section of the shorts production that was directed by Clampett, while Davis had to finish everything else.
This marks the first appearance of the Goofy Gophers, who would appear in eight more shorts in the Golden Age of American Animation. This cartoon also marks the first appearance of an unnamed dog which would appear in only the first three Goofy Gophers cartoons: this one, "Two Gophers from Texas" and "A Ham in a Role".

References

1940s English-language films
1947 animated films
1947 short films
1940s Warner Bros. animated short films
Looney Tunes shorts
Animated films about dogs
Films directed by Arthur Davis
Films scored by Carl Stalling
Bugs Bunny films
Goofy Gophers films
American comedy short films
American animated short films
Films about rodents